M M Dandapani Desikar (August 27, 1908 – June 26, 1972) was a Carnatic vocalist, actor and composer.

'Isai Arasu' Dandapani Desikar was born in Tiruchengattangudi, near Nannilam in Madras Presidency. He got training from Manicka Desikar and Kumbakonam Rajamanickam Pillai. He was the son of Muthiah Desikar. He gave his first performance in Tirumarugal. He was a Professor and Head of the Department of Music, Annamalai University for fifteen years. He acted in Tamil films including Nandanar which was produced by S. S. Vasan.

Desikar is one of those singers who have performed full-fledged Tirukkural concerts.

Songs

Movies

Awards
 Sangeetha Kalasikhamani, 1955 by The Indian Fine Arts Society, Chennai

Citations

References

External links
Short profile
 M Dandapani Desikar
M M Dandapani
Profile of artists
M. M. Dandapani Desikar's Compositions

Male Carnatic singers
Carnatic singers
1908 births
1972 deaths
Academic staff of Annamalai University
20th-century Indian male singers
20th-century Indian singers
Recipients of the Sangeet Natak Akademi Award